129 West Trade is a  high-rise in Charlotte, North Carolina. It was built in 1958 and has 15 floors. The building is clad with 3,822 - 2,000 pound (890 kg) precast concrete facade panels which measure 5.5 by 6 feet (1.6 by 1.8 m).

This building was home to the Wachovia Charlotte office prior to 1975, when the bank moved to 400 South Tryon. The Charlotte Chamber of Commerce occupied the building from 1975 to 1995.

See also
 List of tallest buildings in Charlotte

References

 Emporis

Office buildings in Charlotte, North Carolina
Office buildings completed in 1958
Harrison & Abramovitz buildings